Metaphatus sinuatus is a moth of the  family Palaephatidae. It was described by Donald R. Davis in 1986. It is known from one location in central Chile.

The length of the forewings is about 7 mm. Adults have light brown forewings. They are on wing in November, probably in one generation per year.

Etymology
The specific name is derived from Latin sinuatus (meaning bend or curve) and refers to the sinuate apex of the lateral anellar arms in the male.

References

Moths described in 1986
Palaephatidae
Taxa named by Donald R. Davis (entomologist)
Endemic fauna of Chile